April Group is a French insurance company, headquartered in Lyon, France. It designs, manages and distributes insurance solutions and assistance services for individuals, professionals and businesses.  It offers its customers and partners health and personal protection for individuals, professionals and VSEs, loan insurance, international medical insurance, property and casualty niche insurance, and wealth management.
Established in 1988 and based in Lyon, APRIL has 2,300 employees whose activity covers 18 countries, and produced a turnover of €544m in 2021.

History 
Bruno Rousset and Xavier Coquard co-founded the insurance broker April Assurances. In 1988, the company had fifteen employees. The growth of the company was first organic, but later grew by external acquisitions.

The APRIL group, a wholesale insurance broker, offers products and services to a network of independent distributors (brokers and insurance agents). APRIL started out in early 1988 with a network of 500 brokers, which soon rose to over 800 by the end of the year.

By introducing third party administration (which became Aglae in 1988) and making its first acquisitions (CPA Vie, Cetim), APRIL broadened its scope, becoming an insurer, diversified its range, and became a network. The APRIL group went public (Second Marché of the Paris stock exchange) on 23rd October 1997.

The 2000s saw significant European expansion, with the creation of the first Italian subsidiary, APRIL Spa, established in Milan, and growth centred on insurance niches. 

In 2007, the group launched its first activities in North America through the acquisition of two wholesale brokers in Canada. The group stepped up its investments with five further external acquisitions and ten new companies established. The new headquarters were opened in Lyon, on boulevard Vivier-Merle. 

In early 2010, the APRIL group employed over 3,500 staff members across 70 different companies. These companies within the APRIL Group holding had operations in France (and in French overseas departments and territories), Germany, Spain, Italy, Hungary, Poland as well as Canada and the UK (25 countries in total).

In 2011, the group began a digital drive by launching its first direct distribution website (www.april.fr) so that policyholders could access all APRIL’s products and services directly. 

The following year, APRIL consolidated its international health insurance activities by acquiring a wholesale broker in the UK specialised in expatriate health insurance, and completed its first acquisition in Asia. A few years later, it launched a strategy to refocus its activities through targeted acquisitions (including loan insurance with La Centrale de Financement, Eloa and Comparadise).

In 2019, APRIL, Evolem and CVC Capital Partners announced they had agreed to transfer Evolem’s stakes (which represented 65.13% of APRIL’s capital) to Andromeda Investissements, a buyout company controlled by funds managed by CVC Capital Partners, in which Evolem and APRIL’s management held a minority stake. A new executive committee was set up, led by Eric Maumy, and a new strategic plan put in place as early as 2020 to spur on the group’s transformation. 

In November 2022, the group announced that it had signed a new, long-term, strategic partnership with the international investment company KKR, and demonstrated its international expansion ambition by opening offices in Germany and Dubai.

External links
 Official Website

Companies based in Lyon